Robert Frank Barron (January 13, 1928 – August 2, 1991) was a NASCAR driver from Bradenton, Florida.

Life and career
Barron was born in American Falls, Idaho in January 1928. He served in the U.S. Navy during World War II.

He completed in thirty-two Grand National/Nextel Cup Series events in his career, earning five top-tens.

Barron debuted to NASCAR in 1960, racing his own car in the fall race at Charlotte. Starting 46th in the fifty-car field, Barron completed most of the race before finishing 30th with mechanical woes.

The rest of Barron's starts came in 1961, when Barron completed 31 of the 52 races in the season en route to a 29th-place effort in the points. He earned a 9th-place effort in his season debut at Charlotte Fairgrounds. He would finish 9th twice more in the year, along with a career-best 8th place showing at Richmond and Birmingham, his only career top-tens.

Barron did the most with his limited resources, finishing 19 of his 32 career starts, but ran out of funds following the 1961 season and retired. He died in Brandenton in August 1991 at the age of 63.

References

1928 births
1991 deaths
NASCAR drivers
Racing drivers from Florida
Sportspeople from Bradenton, Florida